Amanda Anisimova was the defending champion, but was chosen to compete in the women's singles instead as a wild card losing to Taylor Townsend in the first round.

Wang Xiyu won the title, defeating Clara Burel in the final, 7–6(7–4), 6–2.

Seeds

Main draw

Finals

Top half

Section 1

Section 2

Bottom half

Section 3

Section 4

Qualifying

Seeds

Qualifiers

Draw

First qualifier

Second qualifier

Third qualifier

Fourth qualifier

Fifth qualifier

Sixth qualifier

Seventh qualifier

Eighth qualifier

External links 
 Draw

Girls' Singles
US Open, 2018 Girls' Singles